Mais may refer to:

People
John A. Mais (1888 – unknown), a German racecar driver
Petre Mais (1885–1975), a prolific British author, journalist and broadcaster
Roger Mais (1905–1955), a Jamaican journalist, novelist, poet, and playwright
Mais Hamdan (born 1982), a Jordanian actress, singer and television presenter

Other uses
Mais (album), an album by Brazilian singer Marisa Monte
Mayıs (also Mais), a village in the Lachin Rayon of Azerbaijan
Mais (Bowness), a Roman fort on Hadrian's Wall, Cumbria, England

See also

MAIS (disambiguation)
Mai (disambiguation)
Maize (disambiguation)
Mayes, a surname
Dumais, a surname